Kuokkanen is a Finnish surname. Notable people with the surname include:

 Erkki Kuokkanen (1887–1956), Finnish lawyer and politician
 Ilpo Kuokkanen (born 1964), Finnish entrepreneur and investor
 Janne Kuokkanen (born 1998), Finnish ice hockey forward

Finnish-language surnames